The 2017 Colombian Women's Football League season (officially known as the 2017 Liga Águila Femenina season for sponsorship reasons) was the first season of Colombia's top-flight women's football league. The season started on 17 February and concluded on 24 June 2017.

The two-legged final was played between Atlético Huila and Santa Fe. Santa Fe were the champions after beating Atlético Huila 2–1 in the first leg and 1–0 in the second leg for a 3–1 win on aggregate score, and qualified for the 2017 Copa Libertadores Femenina.

Format
The 18 teams competed in three round-robin regional hexagonals. The top two teams in each hexagonal along with the two best third-placed teams moved on to the quarterfinals, with the winners advancing to the semifinals. The winners of each semifinal played the finals, which determined the first champions of the Women's League. All rounds in the knockout stage were played on a home-and-away basis.

Teams 
18 teams took part in the competition. The teams are affiliated with DIMAYOR affiliate clubs.

Stadia and locations 

a: Played home games at El Carmen de Bolívar.
b: Played home games at Zipaquirá.
c: Played home games at Cali.

First stage
The First stage began on 17 February and consisted of three round-robin hexagonals.

Group A

Group B

Group C

Ranking of third-placed teams
The two best teams among those ranked third qualified for the knockout stage.

Knockout phase bracket

Top goalscorers

Source: Futbolred

See also
 Colombian Women's Football League

References

External links 
 Season at soccerway.com
 Dimayor's official website 

2017 in South American football leagues
2017 in Colombian football
Colombian Women's Football League
2017 in Colombian women's sport